Ercheia subsignata is a species of moth of the family Erebidae. It is found in the Republic of Congo, the Democratic Republic of Congo (North Kivu, East Kasai, Orientale), Ethiopia, Gabon, Ghana, Kenya, Malawi, Nigeria, Sierra Leone and São Tomé & Principe.

References

Moths described in 1865
Ercheiini
Moths of Africa